The Earle A. & Virginia H. Chiles Center is a 4,852-seat multi-purpose arena in Portland, Oregon, USA. The arena opened in 1984. It is home to the University of Portland Pilots men's and women's basketball teams as well as the women's volleyball team. It hosted the West Coast Conference men's basketball tournament in 1992 and 2007.

The arena is also used as for other athletic tournaments as well as for concerts and other special events such as high school graduations.  It contains  of arena floor space.

History
Construction on the center began in 1983 with an endowment from the Chiles Foundation, and the new facility opened in 1984. In 2006, the school completed $1 million in upgrades to the women's locker rooms, followed by renovations of the weight room in 2008.  In 2010, the scoreboard over center court was replaced with a new center-hung video system. In addition to the video system, two new basketball scoreboards were installed along with three-sided shot clocks. The school plans to continue renovations, as well as some expansion, with a $2 million project on upgrading the men's locker rooms, as well as expansions and the construction of a study center for student athletes.

Gallery

See also
List of sports venues in Portland, Oregon
List of NCAA Division I basketball arenas

References

External links

University of Portland Athletic Facilities

1984 establishments in Oregon
Basketball venues in Oregon
Indoor arenas in Oregon
College basketball venues in the United States
High school sports in Oregon
Portland Pilots basketball
Sports venues in Portland, Oregon
Volleyball venues in the United States
Sports venues completed in 1984
Modernist architecture in Oregon
University and college buildings completed in 1984